Expressions Galerie D'Art is located in Port-au-Prince, Haiti. It is one of Haiti's largest galleries, with an extensive collection of haitian art works. It was founded  years ago with a collection of contemporary Haitian art. The gallery later relocated to larger new premises down the hill of Montagne Noire in Pétion-Ville.

History

In July 1991, a young local couple, Habib and Khatia Jiha, decided to combine their love of art with the facts of business by opening "Expressions Art Gallery" in Pétion-Ville, Haiti. Two months later, the country suffered a terrible coup d'etat, and the international community imposed a two years embargo on Haiti. Despite all the turmoil and problems caused by the political situation, the gallery survived.

Expressions Art Gallery aims to promote and support Haitian art and artists in Haiti and abroad, by participating actively in many art exhibits in the world.

Born and raised in Haiti, they adopted this country as their own, as they learn to love and appreciate its rich culture. The couple confesses that the most enjoyable aspects of their gallery experience is helping international visitors as well as Haitians, discover Haitian art while many of them are amazed and still wondering how Haiti shelters such a hidden treasure.

Collection highlights 
During the year, number of individual and group exhibitions are held in the gallery and are open to the public. The gallery is also an active sponsor of the arts and upcoming artists.

Art museums and galleries in Haiti
Art galleries established in 1991
1991 establishments in Haiti
Pétion-Ville